John Hubert Edward Daunt (30 December 1865 – 16 July 1952) was a British golfer. He competed in the men's individual event at the 1900 Summer Olympics. His father, Colonel John Charles Campbell Daunt, was a recipient of the Victoria Cross.

References

External links
 

1865 births
1952 deaths
Amateur golfers
British male golfers
Olympic golfers of Great Britain
Golfers at the 1900 Summer Olympics
People from Muzaffarpur